Blow Up is an EP and the debut release by Australian electronic dance music duo The Presets, released in November 2003 by record label Modular.

Production and content 

Blow Up was written, recorded, produced, mixed and engineered by Presets members Julian Hamilton and Kim Moyes. It is considered a demo recording. Silverchair's vocalist and lead guitarist Daniel Johns guests on three tracks and co-wrote the song "Cookie" with the duo.

Release and reception 

Blow Up was released on 17 November 2003 by record label Modular. "Beat On / Beat Off" was released to radio as a single and received airplay on Triple J.

Australian Music Online described the release as "a dirty dark soundtrack to sweaty clubs that reeked of sex and sweat and [...] was electro pop delivered with rock'n'roll aggression." Jose Solis of PopMatters wrote that the EP "announced the arrival of an act that was unafraid to get down and dirty when it came to mixing rock beats with pulsating electronic tempo, something that has become the norm as EDM and electronica become the most popular music genres around".

Track listing

Release history

References

External links 

 

The Presets albums
2004 EPs
Modular Recordings EPs